Castiglia is an Italian surname. Notable people with the surname include:

Albert Castiglia (born 1969), American musician
Ferdinando Castiglia (died 1521), Italian Roman Catholic bishop
Francesco Castiglia (1891–1973), later Frank Costello, Italian-American crime boss
Ivan Castiglia (born 1988), Italian footballer
Jim Castiglia (1918–2007), American football player
Luca Castiglia (born 1989), Italian footballer
Paul Castiglia (born 1966), American comic book writer and editor
Vincent Castiglia (born 1982), American painter

Italian-language surnames